The following is a list of all The Joy of Painting episodes.

Series overview

Episodes

Season 1 (1983)

The Joy of Painting aired 403 episodes over 31 seasons, lasting from 1983 to 1994.

The first season of The Joy of Painting was mostly aired on PBS stations across the East Coast, as a result, the initial audience was small. Season1 was produced at WNVC in Falls Church, Virginia and featured several stylistic differences from the more well-known format that was introduced in Season 2: Ross wore tinted glasses in every episode, there was no opening sequence, light instrumental background music played throughout each episode, and a different theme song, heard only at the end of the episode during closing credits, was used. Ross also had not yet perfected his on-camera persona and some of his hallmarks were not yet present.

Season 2 (1983)

Now with a national audience, The Joy of Painting was produced by WIPB in Muncie, Indiana. WIPB continued producing The Joy of Painting until the show's ending in 1994.

Season 3 (1984)

Season 4 (1984)

Season 5 (1985)

Season 6 (1985)

Season 7 (1985)

Season 8 (1986)

Season 9 (1986)

Season 10 (1986)

Season 11 (1986–1987)

Season 12 (1987)

Season 13 (1987)

Season 14 (1987–1988)

Season 15 (1988)

Season 16 (1988)

Season 17 (1989)

Season 18 (1989)

Season 19 (1990)

 "Snowfall Magic" (January 3, 1990)
 "Quiet Mountain Lake" (January 10, 1990)
 "Final Embers of Sunlight" (January 17, 1990)
 "Snowy Morn" (January 24, 1990)
 "Camper's Haven" (January 31, 1990)
 "Waterfall in the Woods" (February 7, 1990)
 "Covered Bridge Oval" (February 14, 1990)
 "Scenic Seclusion" (February 21, 1990)
 "Ebb Tide" (February 28, 1990)
 "After the Rain" (March 7, 1990)
 "Winter Elegance" (March 14, 1990)
 "Evening's Peace" (March 21, 1990)
 "Valley of Tranquility" (March 28, 1990)

Season 20 (1990)

 "Mystic Mountain" (April 4, 1990)
 "New Day's Dawn" (April 11, 1990)
 "Pastel Winter" (April 18, 1990)
 "Hazy Day" (April 25, 1990)
 "Divine Elegance" (May 2, 1990)
 "Cliffside" (May 9, 1990)
 "Autumn Fantasy" (May 16, 1990)
 "Old Oak Tree" (May 23, 1990)
 "Winter Paradise" (May 30, 1990)
 "Days Gone By" (June 6, 1990)
 "Change of Seasons" (June 13, 1990)
 "Hidden Delight" (June 20, 1990)
 "Double Take" (June 27, 1990)

Season 21 (1990)

 "Valley View" (September 5, 1990)
 "Tranquil Dawn" (September 12, 1990)
 "Royal Majesty" (September 19, 1990)
 "Serenity" (September 26, 1990)
 "Cabin at Trial's End" (October 3, 1990)
 "Mountain Rhapsody" (October 10, 1990)
 "Wilderness Cabin" (October 17, 1990)
 "By the Sea" (October 24, 1990)
 "Indian Summer" (October 31, 1990)
 "Blue Winter" (November 7, 1990)
 "Desert Glow" (November 14, 1990)
 "Lone Mountain" (November 21, 1990)
 "Florida's Glory" (November 28, 1990)

Season 22 (1991)

 "Autumn Images" (January 1, 1991)
 "Hint of Springtime" (January 8, 1991)
 "Around the Bend" (January 15, 1991)
 "Countryside Oval" (January 22, 1991)
 "Russet Winter" (January 29, 1991)
 "Purple Haze" (February 5, 1991)
 "Dimensions" (February 12, 1991)
 "Deep Wilderness Home" (February 19, 1991)
 "Haven in the Valley" (February 26, 1991)
 "Wintertime Blues" (March 5, 1991)
 "Pastel Seascape" (March 12, 1991)
 "Country Creek" (March 19, 1991)
 "Silent Forest" (March 26, 1991)

Season 23 (1991)

 "Frosty Winter Morn" (September 3, 1991)
 "Forest Edge" (September 10, 1991)
 "Mountain Ridge Lake" (September 17, 1991)
 "Reflections of Gold" (September 24, 1991)
 "Quiet Cove" (October 1, 1991)
 "River's Peace" (October 8, 1991)
 "At Dawn's Light" (October 15, 1991)
 "Valley Waterfall" (October 22, 1991)
 "Toward Day's End" (October 29, 1991)
 "Falls in the Glen" (November 5, 1991)
 "Frozen Beauty in Vignette" (November 12, 1991)
 "Crimson Tide" (November 19, 1991)
 "Winter Bliss" (November 26, 1991)

Season 24 (1992)

 "Grey Mountain" (January 7, 1992)
 "Wayside Pond" (January 14, 1992)
 "Teton Winter" (January 21, 1992)
 "Little Home in the Meadow" (January 28, 1992)
 "Pretty Autumn Day" (February 4, 1992)
 "Mirrored Images" (February 11, 1992)
 "Back-Country Path" (February 18, 1992)
 "Graceful Waterfall" (February 25, 1992)
 "Icy Lake" (March 3, 1992)
 "Rowboat on the Beach" (March 10, 1992)
 "Portrait of Winter" (March 17, 1992)
 "Footbridge" (March 24, 1992)
 "Snowbound Cabin" (March 31, 1992)

Season 25 (1992)

 "Hide-a-Way Cove" (August 25, 1992)
 "Enchanted Falls Oval" (September 1, 1992)
 "Not Quite Spring" (September 8, 1992)
 "Splashes of Autumn" (September 15, 1992)
 "Summer in the Mountains" (September 22, 1992)
 "Oriental Falls" (September 29, 1992)
 "Autumn Palette" (October 6, 1992)
 "Cypress Swamp" (October 13, 1992)
 "Downstream View" (October 20, 1992)
 "Just Before the Storm" (October 27, 1992)
 "Fisherman's Paradise" (November 3, 1992)
 "Desert Hues" (November 10, 1992)
 "The Property Line" (November 17, 1992)

Season 26 (1992–1993)

 "In the Stillness of Morning" (December 1, 1992)
 "Delightful Meadow Home" (December 8, 1992)
 "First Snow" (December 15, 1992)
 "Lake in the Valley" (December 22, 1992)
 "A Trace of Spring" (December 29, 1992)
 "An Arctic Winter Day" (January 5, 1993)
 "Snow Birch" (January 12, 1993)
 "Early Autumn" (January 19, 1993)
 "Tranquil Wooded Stream" (January 26, 1993)
 "Purple Mountain Range" (February 2, 1993)
 "Storm's a Comin'" (February 9, 1993)
 "Sunset Aglow" (February 16, 1993)
 "Evening at the Falls" (February 23, 1993)

Season 27 (1993)

 "Twilight Beauty" (March 2, 1993)
 "Angler's Haven" (March 9, 1993)
 "Rustic Winter Woods" (March 16, 1993)
 "Wilderness Falls" (March 23, 1993)
 "Winter at the Farm" (March 30, 1993)
 "Daisies at Dawn" (April 6, 1993)
 "A Spectacular View" (April 13, 1993)
 "Daybreak" (April 20, 1993)
 "Island Paradise" (April 27, 1993)
 "Sunlight in the Shadows" (May 4, 1993)
 "Splendor of a Snowy Winter" (May 11, 1993)
 "Forest River" (May 18, 1993)
 "Golden Glow of Morning" (May 20, 1993)

Season 28 (1993)

 "Fisherman's Trail" (May 25, 1993) - After painting the canvas to resemble wood, Ross paints a landscape with the titular trail, plus mountains, trees, water, and shrubbery, but no sky.
 "A Warm Winter" (June 1, 1993)
 "Under Pastel Skies" (June 8, 1993)
 "Golden Rays of Sunlight" (June 15, 1993)
 "The Magic of Fall" (June 22, 1993)
 "Glacier Lake" (June 29, 1993)
 "The Old Weathered Barn" (July 6, 1993)
 "Deep Forest Falls" (July 13, 1993)
 "Winter's Grace" (July 20, 1993)
 "Splendor of Autumn" (July 27, 1993)
 "Tranquil Seas" (August 3, 1993)
 "Mountain Serenity" (August 10, 1993)
 "Home Before Nightfall" (August 17, 1993)

Season 29 (1993)
 "Island in the Wilderness" (August 24, 1993)
 "Autumn Oval" (August 31, 1993)
 "Seasonal Progression" (September 7, 1993)
 "Light at the Summit" (September 14, 1993)
 "Countryside Barn" (September 21, 1993)
 "Mountain Lake Falls" (September 28, 1993) Special guest: Steve Ross (Bob's son)
 "Cypress Creek" (October 5, 1993)
 "Trapper's Cabin" (October 12, 1993)
 "Storm on the Horizon" (October 19, 1993)
 "Pot O' Posies" (October 26, 1993) Special Guest Artist: Annette Kowalski (business partner of Bob Ross)
 "A Perfect Winter Day" (November 2, 1993)
 "Aurora's Dance" (November 9, 1993)
 "Woodsman's Retreat" (November 16, 1993)

Season 30 (1993–1994)

 "Babbling Brook" (November 23, 1993)
 "Woodgrain View" (November 30, 1993)
 "Winter's Peace" (December 7, 1993)
 "Wilderness Trail" (December 14, 1993)
 "A Copper Winter" (December 21, 1993)
 "Misty Foothills" (December 28, 1993)
 "Through the Window" (January 4, 1994)
 "Home in the Valley" (January 11, 1994)
 "Mountains of Grace" (January 18, 1994) Special Guest Artist: Steve Ross
 "Seaside Harmony" (January 25, 1994)
 "A Cold Spring Day" (February 1, 1994)
 "Evening's Glow" (February 8, 1994)
 "Blue Ridge Falls" (February 15, 1994)

Season 31 (1994)

The 31st and final season of The Joy of Painting aired on PBS in 1994, before the death of Bob Ross on July 4, 1995.
 "Reflections of Calm" (February 22, 1994)
 "Before the Snowfall" (March 1, 1994)
 "Winding Stream" (March 8, 1994)
 "Tranquility Cove" (March 15, 1994)
 "Cabin in the Hollow" (March 22, 1994)
 "View From Clear Creek" (March 29, 1994)
 "Bridge to Autumn" (April 5, 1994)
 "Trail's End" (April 12, 1994)
 "Evergreen Valley" (April 19, 1994)
 "Balmy Beach" (April 26, 1994)
 "Lake at the Ridge" (May 3, 1994) (featuring Steve Ross)
 "In the Midst of Winter" (May 10, 1994)
 "Wilderness Way" (May 17, 1994)

Reflist

External links
 

Lists of American non-fiction television series episodes